Salvator Pélégry (25 March 1898 – 16 February 1965) was a French swimmer. He competed in two events at the 1924 Summer Olympics.

References

External links
 

1898 births
1965 deaths
French male freestyle swimmers
Olympic swimmers of France
Swimmers at the 1924 Summer Olympics
Sportspeople from Var (department)